Namuwongo Blazers, commonly known as Nam Blazers, are an Ugandan basketball team based in Namuwongo, Kampala. They are playing in the NBL Uganda, the country's top level league.

The team was established in 2015. They were promoted to the NBL Uganda in 2019, after finishing as runners-up in the NBL2. signing strong players from NBL competitors

Season by season

References
 

Basketball teams in Uganda
Basketball teams established in 2015
Sport in Kampala